Calliotropis dicrous is a species of sea snail, a marine gastropod mollusk in the family Eucyclidae.

Description
The length of the shell reaches 11 mm.

Distribution
This species occurs in the Pacific Ocean off the Solomon Islands.

References

 Vilvens C. (2007) New records and new species of Calliotropis from Indo-Pacific. Novapex 8 (Hors Série 5): 1–72.

External links
 

dicrous
Gastropods described in 2007